The UEFA Euro 2004 qualifying play-offs were the last round of qualifying competition for UEFA Euro 2004. They were contested by the ten runners-up from the first-round groups of the UEFA Euro 2004 qualifying tournament. The winners of each of the five home and away ties joined the group winners in the European Championship in Portugal. The matches were played on 15 and 19 November 2003.

Qualified teams
All ten group runners-up from the qualifying groups entered the play-offs:

Draw
The draw for the play-offs was held on 13 October 2003 in Frankfurt, Germany, to determine the five pairings as well as the order of the home and away ties. No seeding system was used, making the draw an open one.

Summary

|}

Matches

Latvia won 3–2 on aggregate and qualified for UEFA Euro 2004.

Netherlands won 6–1 on aggregate and qualified for UEFA Euro 2004.

Croatia won 2–1 on aggregate and qualified for UEFA Euro 2004.

Russia won 1–0 on aggregate and qualified for UEFA Euro 2004.

Spain won 5–1 on aggregate and qualified for UEFA Euro 2004.

Goalscorers

References

UEFA Euro 2004 qualifying
2003–04 in Slovenian football
2003–04 in Welsh football
2003 in Russian football
play
2003–04 in Scottish football
2003–04 in Turkish football
2003 in Latvian football
playoff
2003 in Norwegian football
Croatia at UEFA Euro 2004
Latvia at UEFA Euro 2004
Russia at UEFA Euro 2004